Live and Unreleased may refer to:
Live and Unreleased, an EP by The Urge
Live and Unreleased (album), an album by Weather Report